Melicuccà is a comune (municipality) in the Province of Reggio Calabria in the Italian region Calabria, located about  southwest of Catanzaro and about  northeast of Reggio Calabria.

Melicuccà borders the following municipalities: Bagnara Calabra, San Procopio, Sant'Eufemia d'Aspromonte, Seminara.

References

Cities and towns in Calabria